Nechezol was a coffee substitute, imposed on the market in the last years of communism in Romania.

Coffee had disappeared from Romanian stores (though black markets existed) in the 1980s, with the drastic limitation of imports. Nechezol contained only one-fifth coffee, the balance being barley, oats, chickpeas and chestnuts.  Its pejorative nickname is derived from the verb a necheza (to neigh), alluding to the oats (usually fed to horses), with the chemical suffix -ol giving a pseudoscientific touch alluding to Elena Ceaușescu, "world-renowned scientist", wife of dictator Nicolae Ceaușescu.

Nechezol contained no caffeine.

Notes and references

See also 
Cereal coffee
Postum

Romanian drinks
Coffee substitutes
Socialist Republic of Romania